Osvaldo Tomás Sáez Álvarez (29 December 1920 – 9 July 1959) was a Chilean football midfielder who played for Chile in the 1950 FIFA World Cup. He also played for Colo-Colo.

References

External links
FIFA profile

1920 births
1959 deaths
Chilean footballers
Chile international footballers
Association football midfielders
Colo-Colo footballers
1950 FIFA World Cup players